Media reform refers to proposed attempts to reform mass media towards an agenda which is more in tune with public needs and away from a perceived bias toward corporate, government or political biases. Media reform advocates also place a strong emphasis upon enabling those who are marginalized or semi-marginalized by their individual incomes, immutable characteristics or desperate conditions to possess access to means of publication and dissemination of information. They do not come from a concern with policy, or with a desire to democratize federal bureaucracies and regulations.

A related concept, media justice, refers to an analytical framework and a regional, grassroots movement led by historically disenfranchised communities to transform media and cultural production, rights and policy in the service of social justice. The Media Justice Framework offers a new way to understand and redistribute media power to achieve a fair and accessible information and cultural apparatus that fulfils its promise to inform the public, watchdog power, and serve all segments of the public equally. The Movement for Media Justice believes that media production and distribution must be under the control of communities, not companies; and that achieving social justice victories requires a secondary strategy for media policy change.

History 

Media reform movement coincides with media democracy as a concept and is interlinked with the agenda setting theory. In 1922, in his book, Public Opinion, Walter Lippmann argued that the mass media are the principal connection between events in the world and the images in the minds of the public. He stated that the media has an ability to influence the thoughts and opinions of the members of public consuming the content. He did not use the term "agenda setting", but scholars have come to agree that was the core concept.

Under the media reform movement there is the traditional media reform movement which has its roots in the broadcasting and freedom of press movements and has been linked with the feminist movement as well as racial and gender justice. However, mainstream media reform groups have so far steered clear from acknowledging media reform’s roots in content work, including the legal victory by the United Church of Christ that forced changes in hiring and reporting practices in Mississippi television journalism. This is said to be done in order to maintain the support of conservative patrons and to downplay the importance of more controversial critical junctures that have shaped the way media reform movement is today.

It has also been affected by federal policy advocacy, whereby media outlets and governments alter their broadcasting practices to attract powerful allies and making their agenda the national public agenda. Funders provide financial support that support the media outlets and drives business.

The traditional media reform movement has however undergone some significant changes with the rise of citizen journalism, whereby citizens play an active role in the process of collecting, reporting, analyzing, and disseminating news and information. The modern media reform movement relies heavily on the Internet and the numerous social networking tools it offers and the Internet coupled with citizen curated content has led to a decrease in the popularity of traditional media networks.

In Canada 

The Canadian media reform movement has its roots in the 1930s, Canadian Campaign for Press and Broadcasting Freedom. Highlighting the threats of cultural Americanisation and excessive commercialism, and calling for universal radio service that would not be viable through market forces alone, the Canadian Radio League assembled a blue-ribbon coalition to persuade a Conservative government to create the Canadian Broadcasting Corporation.

Some of the notable sites and advocates of the movement in Canada include thetyee.ca, the Media Co-op, Media Democracy Days, OpenMedia.ca, the Aboriginal Peoples Television and print outlets such as Canadian Dimension.

Launched in 2001 and originating in Vancouver, British Columbia, Media Democracy Days are organized around the country with the aim of knowing, being and changing the media. They encourage citizen journalism and expect netizens to take responsibility for bringing the change they wish to see in media. It is part of the Media Democracy Project that aims to create a significant presence for noncommercial media in Canada.

OpenMedia.ca was created in 2007 to celebrate two of the world’s foremost critics of media propaganda, Edward S. Herman and Noam Chomsky, and since then it has managed to earn national resonance and policy impact. It is by far the leader in the Media Reform movement in Canada.

The movement's focus in Canada has been predominantly on the not for profit sector. There is overwhelming recognition of the importance of the Internet in NGO work, and unanimous endorsement of the principle of net neutrality as a regulatory underpinning for equitable and affordable access to the Internet. Trade unions and independent media, arts and culture groups, particularly those representing media and cultural workers, are core advocates for democratic communications. Other groups, especially those concerned with human rights, are also supportive.

In a 2010 survey by Open Media, Canadian mainstream media’s democratic performance has been rated as poor or very poor by Canadians. Although many NGOs report positive relationships with particular media, NGOs appear to have a more favorable view of CBC and of independent media, which relies heavily on citizen journalism and has led to the rise of blogger culture. An overwhelming majority of NGOs agree that the quality and diversity of Canadian journalism affects their organization’s work. There is an encouraging culture of collaboration amongst NGOs in the sectors surveyed. Values such as openness, accessibility, participation, choice, diversity and innovation may resonate well with NGOs in Canada. Media reform organizations should consider some kind of expansive institutional structure, such as an association or network that can facilitate communication and engagement with a broad and diverse array of organizations.

Future 
Media reform movement is a positive step towards a netizen curated web and has given rise to citizen journalism.

Communications guru Frank Luntz has claimed that "A compelling story, even if factually inaccurate, can be more emotionally compelling than a dry recitation of the truth. I have seen how effective language attached to policies that are mainstream and delivered by people who are passionate and effective can change the course of history." Statements such as the ones by Mr. Luntz, encourage people and provide hope that we can be part of a fair and democratic media system. One that not only reports what the public wants but also tells the truth and does not use agenda setting theory for mere popularity.

See also 
 Alternative media
 Citizen media
 Fairness Doctrine
 Media activism
 Media democracy
 National Conference for Media Reform
 Net neutrality
 Category:Media reform to improve democracy on Wikiversity

References 

Mass media industry
Mass media